Touch Me Softly is a 1963 album by George Shearing accompanied by his quintet and a string orchestra.

Reception

Scott Yanow reviewed the album for Allmusic and wrote that "Best is a touching version of "Sunday, Monday or Always"...Actually, for this type of "dreamy" romantic music, the performances are excellent, but one should not expect much jazz on this out-of-print LP."

Track listing 
 "Just Imagine" (Buddy DeSylva, Lew Brown, Ray Henderson) - 2:34
 "Blue Room" (Richard Rodgers, Lorenz Hart) - 2:33
 "You're Blasé" (Bruce Sievier, Ord Hamilton) - 3:07
 "Wait for Me" (Charles DeForest) - 3:05
 "Try a Little Tenderness" (Jimmy Campbell, Reginald Connelly, Harry M. Woods) - 2:45
 "Suddenly It's Spring" (Jimmy Van Heusen, Johnny Burke) - 2:41
 "Be Careful, It's My Heart" (Irving Berlin) - 2:18
 "Sunday, Monday, or Always" (Van Heusen, Burke) - 2:40
 "Lollipops and Roses" (Tony Velona) - 2:40
 "Just as Though You Were Here" (Edgar De Lange, John Benson Brooks) - 3:12
 "Touch Me Softly" (Dick Allen, Stan Hoffman) - 3:37
 "In a Sentimental Mood" (Duke Ellington, Irving Mills, Manny Kurtz) - 3:22

Personnel 
George Shearing - piano, arranger
Gary Burton or Douglas Marsh - vibraphone
Ron Anthony - guitar
Ralph Peña - double bass
Vernel Fournier - drums
Milt Raskin - conducting string choir

Recorded in Los Angeles, 1963.

References

1963 albums
George Shearing albums
Capitol Records albums